Yefimovskaya is a rural locality (a village) in Golovinskoye Rural Settlement, Sudogodsky District, Vladimir Oblast, Russia. The population was 13 as of 2010.

Geography 
Yefimovskaya is located 25 km west of Sudogda (the district's administrative centre) by road. Zakharovo is the nearest rural locality.

References 

Rural localities in Sudogodsky District